"Party Voice" is a song performed by Swedish singer Jessica Andersson. It participated in Melodifestivalen 2018 where it made it to the final.

Charts

References

2018 singles
Jessica Andersson songs
English-language Swedish songs
Melodifestivalen songs of 2018
Swedish pop songs
Song articles with missing songwriters